were an Italian comedy duo made up of Bruno Arena (12 January 1957 – 28 September 2022) and Max Cavallari (born 8 July 1963), both actors and cabaret artists.

They started their artistic career in 1989 on the beaches of Palinuro, between the Indian figs, and this inspired their artistic name as a duo. In the same year they had their first show at the club Fuori Pasto, a cabaret club in Varese.

Since then they have performed both on radio and television, on channels including Italia 1, Canale 5, Italia 7, Radio Deejay, R101.

They also did theatrical performances, tours and movies.

They own the club Arlecchino, in Vedano Olona, where many cabaret artists from Milan and Varese became famous.

Arena died on 28 September 2022, at the age of 65.

References

External links 

 

Italian actors
Italian comedians
Italian comedy duos
Theatre characters introduced in 1989
Comedy theatre characters
Comedy radio characters
Comedy television characters
Comedy film characters
Fictional Italian people
Male characters in theatre
Male characters in television
Male characters in radio
Male characters in film